Dogtanian and the Three Muskehounds (Spanish: D'Artacán y los Tres Mosqueperros), known as The Dog Knight in North America, is a 2021 Spanish computer-animated adventure film directed by Toni García and written by Doug Langdale, based on the 1981 television series of the same name, in turn adapted from Alexandre Dumas' 1844 story of d'Artagnan and The Three Musketeers. The film is produced by Apolo Films (BRB Internacional's cinema studio) and Cosmos Maya.

Plot
Young swordsman Dogtanian dreams of joining the legendary Muskehounds. After proving his ability and earning their trust, he and the Muskehounds must battle the wicked Cardinal Richelieu to defend the King and stop the villain's plot to seize power.

Cast

Original Spanish cast
Miguel Ángel Pérez as Pom D’Artacan
Eduardo Jover as Padre D’Artacan
Gloria Cámara as Madra D’Artacan and Dama de la Reina
Antonio Ramírez as Rofty, Guardia del Cardenal, and Contrabandistas
Ana Esther Alborg as Juliette
Ana María Marí as Milady de Winter
Luis Bajo as Conde de Rochefort
Carlos Kaniowsky as Treville

Catalan cast 

Ivan Labanda as D’Artacan
Raúl Llorens as Amis
José Posada as Pontos
Santi Lorenz as Dogos
Eduardo Jover as D’Artacan's father
Núria Trifol as Juliette
Joan Carles Gustems as Richelieu
José Luis Mediavilla as Pom
Domènech Farell as Widimir
Alicia Laorden as Milady de Winter
Juan Antonio Bernal as Rochefort
Jordi Boixaderas as Treville
Pep Anton Muñoz as King Louis XIII
Alfonso Vallés as Captain Bloodhound

English dub
Tomás Ayuso as Dogtanian
Scott Cleverdon as Dogtanian's father, Captain Bloodhound, Parisian #1, Aristocrat #1
Elisabeth Gray as Dogtanian's mother, Milady, Parrot, Lady-in-Waiting, Flower Girl, Parisian #2, Aristocrat #2, Children
Miguel Ángel Pérez as Sandy, Muskehound #2, Cardinal's Guard #3, Smuggler #3
Robbie K. Jones as Pip, Treville
Karina Piper as Juliette, Queen Anne
W. Blair Holmes as Rochefort
Stephen Hughes as Porthos, Anthos, Richelieu, Muskehound #1, Cardinal's Guard #2, Palace Servants, Dubois, Parisian #3, Aristocrat #3, Capitan of the Lis D'or, Smuggler #2
Julio Perillán as Aramis, King Louis XIII
Jess Espinoza as Widimir, Cardinal's Guard #1, Smuggler #1

Production
According to their main website, BRB Internacional was planning a new feature-length CGI film to be released in 2016, but it was delayed for unknown reasons. In April 2019, it was announced that Apolo Films has since taken over production of the film. On February 11, 2020, the first image of the film was revealed. The film was written by Doug Langdale and directed by Toni Garcia. The film was released on theatres in January 2021 under the title Dogtanian and the Three Muskehounds. It was released on SVOD.

The film maintains the original series opening main theme tune composed by Guido and Maurizio De Angelis. Additionally, they have composed new songs for the film.

Release
In Spain, it was originally slated for an opening in theatres on January 22, 2021 but its release was postponed to August 18, 2021 due to the COVID-19 pandemic.

The film was released in the United Kingdom on June 25, 2021.

In 2022, Viva Pictures released the film on streaming services in North America, retitled The Dog Knight.

Sequel
A new Dogtanian television series, titled Dogtanian, The Hero, is in development. It takes place after the events of the 2021 film.

See also 
 List of Spanish films of 2021

References

External links
 
 

2021 films
2021 computer-animated films
2020s children's comedy films
2020s children's animated films
2020s children's adventure films
2020s children's fantasy films
Animated films based on animated series
Animated films about dogs
Spanish computer-animated films
Films based on The Three Musketeers
Films set in France
Films set in the 17th century
Cultural depictions of Cardinal Richelieu
Cultural depictions of Louis XIII